Vekoshinka is a rural locality (a village) in Chaykovsky, Perm Krai, Russia. The population was 49 as of 2010. There are 8 streets.

Geography 
Vekoshinka is located 55 km northeast of Chaykovsky. Pankovo is the nearest rural locality.

References 

Rural localities in Chaykovsky urban okrug